Natural magic in the context of Renaissance magic is that part of the occult which deals with natural forces directly, as opposed to ceremonial magic which deals with the summoning of spirits. Natural magic sometimes makes use of physical substances from the natural world such as stones or herbs.

Natural magic so defined includes astrology, alchemy, and disciplines that we would today consider fields of natural science, such as astronomy and chemistry (which developed and diverged from astrology and alchemy, respectively, into the modern sciences they are today) or botany (from herbology). The Jesuit scholar Athanasius Kircher wrote that "there are as many types of natural magic as there are subjects of applied sciences".

Heinrich Cornelius Agrippa discusses natural magic in his Three Books of Occult Philosophy (1533), where he calls it "nothing else but the highest power of natural sciences". The Italian Renaissance philosopher Giovanni Pico della Mirandola, who founded the tradition of Christian Kabbalah, argued that natural magic was "the practical part of natural science" and was lawful rather than heretical.

See also

References

Further reading
Charles G. Nauert, Magic and Skepticism in Agrippa's Thought, Journal of the History of Ideas (1957), p. 176.
Ryan J. Stark, Rhetoric, Science, and Magic in Seventeenth-Century England (Washington, DC: The Catholic University of America Press, 2009), 88-114.

History of science
Renaissance
Magic (supernatural)